New York’s 4th congressional district is a congressional district for the United States House of Representatives in central and southern Nassau County, represented by Republican Anthony D'Esposito since 2023.

The district includes the communities of Elmont, Baldwin, Bellmore, East Rockaway, East Meadow, Five Towns, Lynbrook,  Floral Park, Franklin Square, Garden City, Garden City Park, Hempstead, Atlantic Beach, Long Beach, Malverne, Freeport, Merrick, Carle Place, New Hyde Park, Oceanside, Rockville Centre, Roosevelt, Uniondale, Wantagh, West Hempstead, Westbury, and Valley Stream.

NY-04 is the second-wealthiest congressional district in New York, and among the wealthiest nationally. It was one of 18 districts that voted for Joe Biden in the 2020 presidential election while being won or held by a Republican in 2022.

Voting

History

1789–1913:

Parts of Manhattan
1913–1945:
Parts of Brooklyn
1945–1963:
Parts of Queens
1963–present:
Parts of Nassau County

In the 1960s, 1970s and 1980s much of this area was in the 5th District. The 4th District then included many towns in eastern Nassau County now in the 3rd District.

List of members representing the district

Election results 

In New York electoral politics there are numerous smaller parties at various points on the political spectrum. Certain parties invariably endorse either the Republican or Democratic candidate for every office, hence the state electoral results contain both the party votes, and the final candidate votes (Listed as "Recap").

See also

List of United States congressional districts
New York's congressional districts
United States congressional delegations from New York

References 

 1996 House election data, Clerk of the House of Representatives
 1998 House election data, "
 2000 House election data, "
 2002 House election data, "
 2004 House election data, "
 2006 House election data, "

 Congressional Biographical Directory of the United States 1774–present
 National atlas congressional maps

04
Constituencies established in 1789
1789 establishments in New York (state)